Potenza Calcio S.r.l., formerly A.S.D. Rossoblù Potenza F.C. or just Potenza F.C., is an Italian football club based in Potenza, Basilicata. It currently plays in the Serie C.

Potenza Calcio was founded in June 2012 as F.C.D. Rossoblu Potenza, by a merger of two amateur teams Controsenso Potenza and Atella Monticchio. The club had claimed as a phoenix club of Potenza S.C., which was first founded in 1919, adopting an explicit logo after reaching the professional status in 2018. Potenza S.C.was de-registered from Italian Football Federation in April 2012 after played their last season in 2010–11 Eccellenza Basilicata. From 2011–12 to 2012–13 season, another team, Città di Potenza (formerly: Atletico Potenza, P3F Potenza Giocoleria, Lucania Team Giocoleria) was briefly acted as the major successor of Potenza S.C.

Predecessors 
In the 21st century there have been numerous changes in the football teams in the city of Potenza.

F.C. Potenza / Potenza S.C.

Potenza S.C. was the historical team of the city which under many merger and reformation. The club was expelled from 2009–10 Lega Pro Prima Divisione in the mid-season. The club was re-admitted to 2010–11 Eccellenza Basilicata. In April 2012 the membership of the club in Italian Football Federation was officially cancelled.

After the 2010 exclusion, Città di Potenza and F.C.D. Rossoblu Potenza became the successors of the club.

Lucania / Città di Potenza

In 2000 A.C. Lucania Team was founded, starting in the Terza Categoria in the 2000–01 season. The team was then known as A.D. A.C. Lucania Team Giocoleria and then A.S.D. A.C. Parco Tre Fontane Giocoleria, A.S.D. P3F Potenza Giocoleria.

In 2009, the team changed its name again to A.S.D. Atletico Potenza, then won the 2011–12 Eccellenza Basilicata leading to promotion into 2012–13 Serie D.

In 2012 its name changed again to Città di Potenza S.S. a r.l.d.. However, in summer 2013 the club was relegated, but wasn't able to enter ; it was therefore liquidated. The club was also fined €2,500 for an incident during 2012–13 season.

The team played at the Stadio Alfredo Viviani, in Potenza, Italy with a capacity of 5,500 places. Its team colors were red and blue.

Managers
 Nicola Tramutola (2011)

Chairmen
 Pasquale Capobianco (2011)

HonoursEccellenza Basilicata: Winner (1): 2011–12 (as Atletico Potenza)Prima Categoria Basilicata: Winner (1): 2009–10 (as Atletico Potenza)Regional Coppa Italia Basilicata:Winner (1): 2011–12 (as Atletico Potenza)

History
Atella MonticchioA.S.D. Atella Monticchio Vulture, formerly known as Polisportiva Atella Monticchio was a team from Atella, a town in the Province of Potenza. The team itself was a merger of Polisportiva Monticchio, based in Rionero in Vulture, and Polisportiva Atella, based in Atella. The team entered the promotion playoffs of 2006–07 and 2007–08 Eccellenza Basilicata, Italian 6th highest level at that time. The team finished as the losing semi-finalists and losing finalists respectively. The team also entered the first round of the promotion playoffs of 2010–11 Eccellenza, against Adrano of Sicily region.

In June 2012 the club merged with Controsenso Potenza from Promozione Basilicata, Italian 7th highest level at that time. Since Atella Monticchio had a higher league position than Controsenso Potenza, the new team F.C.D. Rossoblù Potenza inherited the position of Atella Monticchio in 2012–13 Eccellenza Basilicata, but relocated to Potenza as one of the illegitimate successor of Potenza S.C. Another illegitimate successor, Città di Potenza, competed in 2012–13 Serie D.

Controsenso PotenzaU.S.D. Controsenso Potenza was a football team founded in 2010 by the merger of "A.S.D. Futura Potenza" and "A.S.D. Real Zara", both from Potenza. They participated in Prima Categoria Basilicata and Terza Categoria Potenza Province respectively in 2009–10 season. That season, as well as 2008–09 season, there were local derbies between the two future successors of Potenza S.C., as Futura Potenza and Atletico Potenza (ex-P3F Potenza) were in the same group: Group A.

The new team at first participated in 2010–11 Prima Categoria Basilicata and won the league in the first season.

Futura Potenza was formerly known as U.S. Potenza Mondo di Biagione and A.S. Geotek Mondo di Biagione. In June 2008 it was relegated to aforementioned 2008–09 Prima Categoria Basilicata.

Real Zara was founded in mid-2008. They participated in Terza Categoria in their 2 years of history.

Rossoblù Potenza / Potenza CalcioF.C.D. Rossoblù Potenza was founded in June 2012 after the merger of "A.S.D. Atella Monticchio Vulture", based in Atella and "U.S.D. Controsenso Potenza", based in Potenza.

In June 2014 it was promoted from Eccellenza Basilicata to 2014–15 Serie D.

In summer 2014 the club was renamed A.S.D. Rossoblù Potenza F.C..

In summer 2015 the club was again renamed to Potenza Calcio S.S.D. a r.l.'''.

The club won the group stage of 2017–18 Serie D and promoted to Serie C.

Colors and badge 
The team's colors are red and blue.

Current squad

Out on loan

Managers
 Pino Camelia (2014?)
 Nicola Ragno (2017–2018)
 Giuseppe Raffaele (2018–2020)

Honours
 Controsenso Potenza
 Prima Categoria Basilicata: 2010–11

 Potenza Calcio
 Serie D Group H 2017–18 (as S.S.D. Potenza Calcio)
 Eccellenza Basilicata: 2013–14 (as Rossoblù Potenza)

References

External links 
Soccerway results
 World football listing
 Tutto campo listing

 
Association football clubs established in 1919
1919 establishments in Italy
Football clubs in Basilicata
Association football clubs established in 2012
2012 establishments in Italy
Phoenix clubs (association football)
Serie B clubs
Serie C clubs
Serie D clubs